The Carnegie Public Library, Monte Vista Branch, located at 120 Jefferson St. in Monte Vista, Colorado, is a small library opened in 1919. The building was designed by leading Denver architect John J. Huddart in the Classical Revival style. In 1995, it was added to the National Register of Historic Places. The Monte Vista Branch is one of two remaining original branches of the Carnegie Public Library.

References

Library buildings completed in 1919
Carnegie libraries in Colorado
Public libraries in Colorado
Libraries on the National Register of Historic Places in Colorado
Buildings and structures in Rio Grande County, Colorado
National Register of Historic Places in Rio Grande County, Colorado